Oliver Venno (born 23 May 1990) is an Estonian volleyball player currently playing for Al Rayyan of the Qatari Volleyball League. He mostly plays at the opposite hitter position but has also played at the outside hitter position on numerous occasions.

Club career
Venno was born in Tartu, and started his career in hometown club Pere Leib Tartu at the age of 16. In addition to three Estonian League silver medals he won the Estonian Cup in 2008 with the and reached the finals of the Baltic League twice. Venno was named the Best Young Estonian Volleyball Player in 2008 and 2009. In summer of 2009 Venno signed with ACH Volley Bled of Slovenia. With the Bled team Venno won the Slovenian League, the Slovenian Cup and the MEVZA Cup. They also reached the Final Four of the 2009–10 CEV Champions League making Venno the first Estonian to play in the semi-finals of the Champions League. In 2010 and 2011 Venno won the Estonian Volleyball Player of the Year award. From 2010 to 2012 he played in Germany for VfB Friedrichshafen and won the German League and the German Cup once. Venno started the 2012–13 season in the Montenegrin top team Budvanska Rivijera Budva. He left the team in December and joined his compatriots Raimo Pajusalu and Keith Pupart in the French team Rennes Volley 35.

For the 2013–14 season Venno signed with Prikamye Perm of the Russian Volleyball Super League. In June 2014 Venno moved to Austria and signed a deal with local powerhouse Hypo Tirol Innsbruck. With Hypo Tirol team he won the Austrian League without losing a single game during the season. He also added a second MEVZA Cup win to his account. In July 2015 Venno signed with Ziraat Bankası Ankara of the Turkish Men's Volleyball League. For the next season he moved to another Ankara-based team Maliye Milli Piyango. Venno was the top scorer of the league and helped his team to 5th-place finish. Venno stayed with the team for another season and helped Maliye Piyango to the final of the Turkish Cup for the first time in the club's history as they lost to Halkbank Ankara with the score 2–3. Venno and Maliye Piyango also reached to the semi-finals of the 2017–18 CEV Challenge Cup where they lost to eventual winner Bunge Ravenna in the golden set.

In May 2018 Venno signed with one of the top Turkish teams, Galatasaray İstanbul. Venno and Galatasaray played in the final of the 2018–19 CEV Cup where they lost to Italian team Diatec Trentino. Venno was the Best Scorer of the competition totaling 190 points in 10 matches. He stayed with Galatasaray for the next season and started off with the Turkish Super Cup title. However, the season was cut short due to the COVID-19 pandemic, which forced to cancel all competitions. After five years in Turkey Venno signed with Police SC Qatar of the Qatari Volleyball League in June 2020. He helped the team win two consecutive league titles and the 2022 Gulf Clubs Championship, where he was named MVP of the tournament. In 2022 Police SC Qatar also won their first Emir of Qatar Cup with Venno scoring 41 points on the final against Al Arabi. 

After two seasons with Police SC Qatar Venno signed with another Qatari top team Al Rayyan. Al Rayyan won the inaugural West Asia Men’s Club Volleyball Championship after defeating Kuwait SC 3–0 in the final with Venno scoring 19 points. He was also named the best opposite hitter of the tournament.

National team
Oliver Venno represented the Estonian youth teams in the U16, U18 and U20 level. He is a member of the Estonian national team since 2008 and has represented his country at the 2009, 2011, 2015, 2017 and 2021 Men's European Volleyball Championships. With the national team Venno also won the 2016 and 2018 European Volleyball League titles.

Venno has also successfully represented Estonia in beach volleyball. Together with Kristo Kollo he won the U18 Beach European Championship in 2007 and U19 Beach World Championship in 2008.

Sporting achievements

Clubs
CEV Cup
  2018/2019 - with Galatasaray İstanbul

MEVZA Cup
  2009/2010 – with ACH Volley Bled
  2014/2015 – with Hypo Tirol Innsbruck

Baltic League
  2007/2008 – with Pere Leib Tartu
  2008/2009 – with Pere Leib Tartu

GCC Volleyball Club Championship
  2022 – with Police SC Qatar

West Asia Men’s Club Volleyball Championship
  2023 – with Al Rayyan

National championship
 2006/2007  Estonian Championship, with Pere Leib Tartu
 2007/2008  Estonian Championship, with Pere Leib Tartu
 2008/2009  Estonian Championship, with Pere Leib Tartu
 2009/2010  Slovenian Championship, with ACH Volley Bled
 2010/2011  German Championship, with VfB Friedrichshafen
 2014/2015  Austrian Championship, with Hypo Tirol Innsbruck
 2018/2019  Turkish Championship, with Galatasaray İstanbul
 2019/2020  Qatari Championship, with Police SC Qatar
 2020/2021  Qatari Championship, with Police SC Qatar
 2021/2022  Qatari Championship, with Police SC Qatar

National cup
 2006/2007  Estonian Cup, with Pere Leib Tartu
 2007/2008  Estonian Cup, with Pere Leib Tartu
 2008/2009  Estonian Cup, with Pere Leib Tartu
 2009/2010  Slovenian Cup, with ACH Volley Bled
 2010/2011  German Cup, with VfB Friedrichshafen
 2011/2012  German Cup, with VfB Friedrichshafen
 2017/2018  Turkish Cup, with Maliye Milli Piyango
 2018/2019  Turkish Cup, with Galatasaray İstanbul
 2019/2020  Turkish Super Cup, with Galatasaray İstanbul
 2020/2021  Qatari Cup, with Police SC Qatar
 2021/2022  Emir Cup, with Police SC Qatar

National team
 2016  European League
 2018  European League
 2018  Challenger Cup
 2021  European League

Individual
 2008 Young Estonian Volleyball Player of the Year
 2009 Young Estonian Volleyball Player of the Year
 2010 Estonian Volleyball Player of the Year
 2011 Estonian Volleyball Player of the Year
 2018 European League – Best Outside Hitter
 2019 CEV Cup – Best Scorer
 2021 Estonian Volleyball Player of the Year
 2022 GCC Volleyball Club Championship – Most Valuable Player
 2023 West Asia Men’s Club Volleyball Championship – Best Opposite Hitter

References

External links
Player Biography 
Player profile on Volleybox
Player profile on the CEV official site
Player profile on the FIVB official site

1990 births
Living people
Sportspeople from Tartu
Estonian men's volleyball players
Estonian expatriate volleyball players
Estonian expatriate sportspeople in Germany
Estonian expatriate sportspeople in Slovenia
Estonian expatriate sportspeople in France
Estonian expatriate sportspeople in Russia
Estonian expatriate sportspeople in Austria
Estonian expatriate sportspeople in Turkey
Estonian expatriate sportspeople in Montenegro
Expatriate volleyball players in Germany
Expatriate volleyball players in Slovenia
Expatriate volleyball players in France
Expatriate volleyball players in Russia
Expatriate volleyball players in Austria
Expatriate volleyball players in Turkey
Expatriate volleyball players in Montenegro
Galatasaray S.K. (men's volleyball) players
Estonian expatriate sportspeople in Qatar
Expatriate volleyball players in Qatar
Estonian beach volleyball players